Trinorfolkia is a genus of triplefins in the family Tripterygiidae.

Species
 Clarke's triplefin, Trinorfolkia clarkei (Morton, 1888)
 Crested triplefin, Trinorfolkia cristata (Kuiter, 1986)
 Notched triplefin, Trinorfolkia incisa (Kuiter, 1986)

References

 
Tripterygiidae
Taxa named by Ronald Fricke